Musa monticola, also known as the Kinabalu mountain banana, is a species of wild banana (genus Musa), native to Sabah on the island of Borneo. It is placed in section Callimusa (now including the former section Australimusa), having a diploid chromosome number of 2n = 20.

Description
Musa monticola is an herbaceous phanerophyte with pseudostem growing to 1 to 2 meters high.

Range and habitat
Musa monticola is known only from the Crocker Range in Sabah, on the slopes of Mount Kinabalu and along the Sinsuron Road, from 1,200 to 1,700 meters elevation.

It inhabits forest clearings and secondary vegetation, including roadsides, in lower montane rain forest.

References

monticola
Endemic flora of Borneo
Flora of Sabah
Plants described in 2000
Flora of the Borneo montane rain forests
Flora of Mount Kinabalu